Paul Moss Bassat is an Australian attorney and businessman. He co-founded online job search website Seek Limited in 1997 with his brother Andrew Bassat. The brothers were co-CEOs until Paul resigned in 2011. Bassat is a Commissioner of the Australian Football League, a director of Wesfarmers Ltd and co-founder of Square Peg Capital.

Career
Paul Bassat was one of three children born to immigrant parents. His father was Egyptian born IBM executive, and his mother was a Polish born lawyer. He attended Brighton Grammar School, where he has been inducted into the school Hall of Fame. Bassat graduated with a Bachelor of Laws and Bachelor of Commerce from the University of Melbourne.

After practicing law at Arnold Bloch Leibler for six years, Bassat co-founded Seek with his brother Andrew in 1997. Their goal was to resolve what they felt were inefficiencies in the existing classified-ad systems. Paul was the joint CEO of the company from 1997 until 2011, he then left SEEK to work in private equity and with early-stage investment fund Square Peg Capital, where he is involved in mentoring management teams that are focused on building outstanding businesses.

In 2012, Bassat became a Commissioner of the Australian Football League. He was only the third Jewish member of the Commission in league history.

References

Australian businesspeople
University of Melbourne alumni
Wesfarmers people
Living people
Year of birth missing (living people)
VFL/AFL administrators
Australian people of Egyptian descent
Australian people of Polish descent
People educated at Brighton Grammar School